Annaphila diva, also called the white annaphila, is a species of moth in the family Noctuidae (the owlet moths). It is found in North America. Adults' fore wings are black with white markings. Their hind wings are white bordered with black. Larvae are brown with dark bands and spots and white stripes. The host plant is miner's lettuce. 

The MONA or Hodges number for Annaphila diva is 9869.

References

Further reading

 
 
 

Amphipyrinae
Articles created by Qbugbot
Moths described in 1873